Tomorrow Speculative Fiction was a science fiction magazine published in the United States from 1993 through 2000.  Over this period, it had 24 bi-monthly issues as a print magazine from 1993 to 1997, then transitioned to become one of the first online science fiction publications until 2000, when it ceased publication. Established as a Pulphouse Publishing magazine, with Dean Wesley Smith as the publisher for magazine's launch at time of the 1992 Worldcon with Algis Budrys as editor, Budrys with the second issue took over as the magazine's publisher, doing business as UniFont. In addition to essays under his own name, Budrys contributed a number of short stories under a variety of his established pen names.

According to an editorial in the first issue, Budrys states that the magazine would publish "science fiction, fantasy, and horror with a fantasy element, at any length. There is a bit of a bias toward newer writers."

During the course of its print run, Tomorrow published such notable authors as Gene Wolfe, Robert Reed, William Barton, Sarah Zettel, Harlan Ellison, and Ursula K. Le Guin. In 1995, Tomorrow was nominated for the Hugo Award for Best Semiprozine.

In the final print issue, Budrys announced "We are going electronic at WWW.TOMORROWSF.COM, and we will print no further issues. Also, the next three issues (#s 25, 26, 27) will be free."

References

External links
Tomorrow SF at ISFDB

Bimonthly magazines published in the United States
Defunct literary magazines published in the United States
Defunct science fiction magazines published in the United States
Magazines established in 1993
Magazines disestablished in 2000
Magazines published in Oregon
Online magazines with defunct print editions
Science fiction magazines established in the 1990s
Science fiction webzines